The F. D. Thomas House is a historic house located at 321 North Ohio Street in Camp Point, Adams County, Illinois. The house was built in 1917 for F. D. Thomas, a successful local banker. Architect Ernest M. Wood, a prominent architect in the Quincy area, designed the Prairie School house. Wood was influenced by the work of Frank Lloyd Wright, and he was primarily responsible for bringing the Prairie School to western Illinois. The house's key Prairie School features include a stucco exterior with wooden trim, casement windows, a low hip roof, and an open interior layout.

The house was listed on the National Register of Historic Places on July 28, 1983.

Notes

Houses in Adams County, Illinois
National Register of Historic Places in Adams County, Illinois
Houses on the National Register of Historic Places in Illinois
Prairie School architecture in Illinois
Houses completed in 1917